Markovac is a small village situated in Mladenovac municipality, one of municipalities of Belgrade, Serbia.

References

Suburbs of Belgrade